The following highways are numbered 952:

United States